Rhodocoma is a group of plants in the Restionaceae described as a genus in 1836. The entire genus is endemic to South Africa (Cape Province and KwaZulu-Natal.

 Species

References

Restionaceae
Endemic flora of South Africa
Flora of KwaZulu-Natal
Flora of the Cape Provinces
Fynbos
Poales genera
Taxa named by Christian Gottfried Daniel Nees von Esenbeck